David Trevor Molyneux  is a British Labour politician and leader of Wigan Metropolitan Borough Council in Greater Manchester. As leader he is also a member of the Greater Manchester Combined Authority and is the combined authority's portfolio lead for Resources and Investment.

First elected to the council in 1982, Molyneux represents the ward of Ince. He was elected as leader of the council in 2018 following Peter Smith's departure from the role after 27 years in post.

Molyneux was appointed Member of the Order of the British Empire (MBE) in the 2022 Birthday Honours for services to local government and the community in Wigan.

References 

Living people
Labour Party (UK) councillors
Leaders of local authorities of England
Year of birth missing (living people)
Members of the Order of the British Empire
Members of the Greater Manchester Combined Authority